Bad Boy is an American rock band from Milwaukee, Wisconsin, United States. The band originally formed under the name Crossfire, and released one single under that name in 1975, until they changed their name to Bad Boy after signing to United Artists in 1977. The group released their first two albums, The Band that Milwaukee Made Famous and Back to Back on United Artists in 1977 and 1978. After being dropped from United Artists, the band released Private Party on the Streetwise label in 1981, followed by self-releasing the Electric Eyes album in 1984. The band broke up sometime in the late 1980s, and reformed in 1998 to release a greatest hits compilation on Surgeland Records. Drummer Jackie Ramos was during the 1990s a member of and played on albums with the bands Hericane Alice, Bangalore Choir and Bad Moon Rising.

In 2002, the band reformed a second time. Since their 2002 reformation, they have released one studio album and one live album on the Legend label, and continue to perform as a regional act in the American Midwest.

The British label Rock Candy reissued their first two albums in 2018.

Discography

As Crossfire
 "I Gotta Move" / "Why Keep Me Waiting" (1975, Real To Reel) (single)

As Bad Boy 
 The Band That Milwaukee Made Famous (1977, United Artists)
 Back to Back (1978, United Artists) 
 Private Party (1981, Streetwise)
 Electric Eyes (1984, self-released) 
 Girl On The Run (1985, Legend)
 Best Of Bad Boy (1998, Surgeland)
 We Should Have Been Dead By Now  (2003, Legend)
 Live Northern Lights (2005, Legend) (live album) 
 No Regrets (2022, self-released)

Members

Current 
 Steve Grimm- Guitar and vocals
 Randall "Xeno" Hogan- Guitar and vocals
 Craig Evans- Bass
 Scott Berendt- Drums

Past 
 Joe Luchessi- Guitar
 John Marcelli- Bass
 Lars Hanson- Drums
 Hector "Jackie" Ramos - Drums
 Ted Mueller- Drums
 Billy "Friday" Johnson - Drums
 Joey La Vie- Guitar
 Kelly Peterson- Guitar

References

External links 
 Official Facebook page
 Steve Grimm official website

Rock music groups from Wisconsin
Musical groups established in the 1970s
Musical groups disestablished in the 1980s
Musical groups established in 1998
Musical groups established in 2002